The Client is a 2011 South Korean courtroom thriller film directed by Sohn Young-sung.

Plot
On his wedding anniversary, Han Chul-min (Jang Hyuk) drives into his apartment complex parking lot and sees a large crowd gathered by the entryway into his apartment. He enters holding a bouquet of flowers for his wife, instead he finds police officers scattered about collecting evidence. In his bedroom there is a large pool of blood dripping onto the floor from the bed, and his wife is nowhere to be seen. Han is then handcuffed, arrested and taken into police custody for her murder.

Prosecutor Ahn Min-ho (Park Hee-soon) takes charge of prosecuting the Han murder case. He has little doubt in the guilt of Chul-min. Confirming his suspicions that Han was arrested as the prime suspect in a serial murder case, but later released on insufficient evidence.
 
Jang Ho-won (Sung Dong-il), an investigator, brings the case of Han to defense lawyer Kang Sung-hee (Ha Jung-woo). He informs Kang that the alleged murder victim's body was never discovered, the police have yet to find any direct evidence connecting Han to the murder of his wife and his arrest is based on circumstantial evidence. Han, who works at a film laboratory, has no fingerprints as they are erased from the strong chemicals he handles every day. Convinced that Han is not guilty, Kang takes the case and applies in court for a jury trial and goes through a series of legal clashes against rival prosecutor Ahn. The case gets even more complex as details about the mysterious life of Han's wife are unveiled.

Cast

 Jang Hyuk as Han Cheol-min (The client)
 Park Hee-soon as Ahn Min-ho (Rival prosecutor)
 Ha Jung-woo as Kang Sung-hee (lawyer)
 Sung Dong-il as Jang Ho-won (Kang's investigator)
 Kim Sung-ryung as Kang's paralegal
 Jung Won-joong as Chief public prosecutor
 Yoo Da-in as Seo Jung-ah (murder victim and Chul-min's wife)
 Park Hyuk-kwon as Police inspector Seo
 Joo Jin-mo as Judge
 Ye Soo-jung as Jung-ah's mother
 Hwang Byeong-guk as detective in charge
 Min Bok-gi as Professor Choi 
 Yoo Soon-woong as elderly man at the store
 Bae Sung-woo as Prosecutor Park 
 Bae Yun-beom as Prosecutor Bae 
 Park Seong-geun as Ranger
 Park Sung-yeon as Jung-ah's co-worker
 Yu Ha-jun as Forensic team member
 Choi Hee-jin as Blood researcher
 Lee Chang-hoon

Reception

References

External links
  
 
 
 

2011 films
2011 crime thriller films
South Korean legal films
South Korean crime thriller films
2010s Korean-language films
Showbox films
South Korean courtroom films
2010s South Korean films